Canarian Nationalist Federation (FNC) was an electoral alliance in the Canary Islands, formed by the Canarian Nationalist Party (PNC), Independents of Fuerteventura (IF) and Lanzarote Independents Party (PIL) ahead of the 1999 Canarian election.

Member parties
Canarian Nationalist Party (PNC)
Independents of Fuerteventura (IF)
Lanzarote Independents Party (PIL)

References

Political parties in the Canary Islands
Political parties established in 1999
Political parties disestablished in 2007
Defunct political party alliances in Spain
1999 establishments in Spain